The President and Ambassador Apartments are two five-story apartment buildings in Lincoln, Nebraska. They were built in 1928–1929 on land owned by Levi Leland Coryell, and designed in the Art Deco style by architect John A. Alexander. They belonged to the L. L. Coryell Building Corporation until 1979. They have been listed on the National Register of Historic Places since December 10, 1993.

References

Apartment buildings in Nebraska
National Register of Historic Places in Lancaster County, Nebraska
Art Deco architecture in Nebraska
Residential buildings completed in 1928